Amy Walters (née Amy Stanton) is an English international lawn and indoor bowler and a Bowls England official.

Bowls career
Walters (as Amy Stanton) won the 2011 Women's Junior Pairs Champions National title. The following year Amy Stanton became the first female to win the women's WIBC Championships three years running.

In 2014 she became the Women's Junior Singles Champion and she was a semi finalist in the 2015 World Indoor Bowls Championship & 2017 World Indoor Bowls Championship. 

In 2015, he won three gold medals at the European Bowls Championships in Israel.

Stanton has twice won the Mixed National titles in 2016 & 2017 with Andy Walters. In between the two titles she married Andy Walters on 22 April 2017.

References

Living people
English female bowls players
1989 births
Bowls European Champions